"Bad Girl" is a song by Lebanese/Canadian R&B/Pop singer Massari. It's the first single from his second studio album Forever Massari.

Music video
A music video was released on iTunes on June 9, 2009, it features Massari's love interest driving a Lotus Exige and Massari following closely behind on a motorbike. It also shows Massari on the beach with the woman.

Charts

References

2009 singles
Massari songs
2009 songs
Songs written by Rupert Gayle
Universal Music Group singles
Songs written by Massari